Boris Georgiyevich Saltykov (born 27 December 1940) is a Russian politician and engineer. He held several cabinet portfolios in the government of Russia during the 1990s, including Minister of Science and Technology, and Deputy Chairman of the Government of the Russian Federation.

Government service
After the collapse of the Soviet Union, Boris Saltykov was appointed as both the Minister of Science and Technology, as well as Deputy Prime Minister for education, in 1992. Although he would be demoted from that latter post in 1993, he held the former office until 1996. During this time Saltykov was regarded as being a key member of Yegor Gaidar's reform team. He acknowledged at one point that the Russian middle class was being decimated by the government's economic policies. Although Prime Minister Viktor Chernomyrdin initially retained most of Gaidar's original team, it ended up disintegrating by March 1993, with Saltykov stepping down from the deputy premiership that month.

In March 1996, in his capacity as science and technology minister, Saltykov visited a conference with NATO discussing increased scientific cooperation between Russia and the bloc. Other concerns he addressed included property rights of Russian scientists.

He was dismissed as science minister in August 1996, at which point the ministry was downgraded to a state committee. It was revived in 1997, however, with Vladimir Fortov appointed to the post in Saltykov's place—a candidate that Saltykov supported for the position.

As of 2004, Saltykov is one of the trustees of Mikhail Khodorkovsky's foundation in the United Kingdom.

Sources

References

Books
 
 
 

1940 births
20th-century Russian politicians
Deputy heads of government of the Russian Federation
Living people
Economists from Moscow
Russian educators
Russian engineers
Moscow Institute of Physics and Technology alumni
First convocation members of the State Duma (Russian Federation)
Academic staff of the Higher School of Economics